Luís de Cifuentes y Sotomayor, O.P. (1600 – 18 May 1676) was a Roman Catholic prelate who served as Bishop of Yucatán (1659–1676).

Biography
Luís de Cifuentes y Sotomayor was born in Seville, Spain in 1600 and ordained a priest in the Order of Preachers.
On 22 September 1659, he was appointed during the papacy of Pope Alexander VII as Bishop of Yucatán.
On 25 July 1660, he was consecrated bishop by Diego Osorio de Escobar y Llamas, Bishop of Tlaxcala.
He served as Bishop of Yucatán until his death on 18 May 1676.
While bishop, he was the principal consecrator of Juan de Escalante Turcios y Mendoza, Archbishop of Santo Domingo (1673).

References

External links and additional sources
 (for Chronology of Bishops) 
 (for Chronology of Bishops) 

17th-century Roman Catholic bishops in Mexico
Bishops appointed by Pope Alexander VII
1600 births
1676 deaths
Dominican bishops